HD 167818 is a class K3II (orange bright giant) star in the constellation Sagittarius. Its apparent magnitude is 4.66 and it is approximately 760 light years away based on parallax.

References

Sagittarius (constellation)
K-type bright giants
CD-27 12684
089678
6842
167818